Diving at the 2015 Southeast Asian Games was held in OCBC Aquatic Centre, in Kallang, Singapore from 6 to 9 June 2015.

Participating nations
A total of 46 athletes from seven nations competed in diving at the 2015 Southeast Asian Games:

Competition schedule
The following is the competition schedule for the diving competitions:

Medalists

Men

Women

Medal table

Events

Men's 3 metre springboard

The men's 3 metre springboard competition was held on 7 June.

Final Results

Men's 10 metre platform
The men's 10 metre platform competition was held on 8 June.

Men's synchronized 3 metre springboard
The men's synchronized 3 metre springboard competition was held on 9 June.

Men's synchronized 10 metre platform

The men's synchronized 10 metre platform competition was held on 6 June.

Results

Women's 3 metre springboard

The women's 3 metre springboard competition was held on 6 June.

Results

Women's 10 metre platform

The women's 10 metre platform competition was held on 9 June.

Results

Women's synchronized 3 metre springboard
The women's synchronized 3 metre springboard was held on 8 June.

Women's synchronized 10 metre platform
The women's synchronized 10 metre platform competition was held on 7 June.

References

External links
 
 
 
 
 
 
 
 
 

2015
Southeast Asian Games
2015 Southeast Asian Games events
Kallang